Kumaoni or Kumauni may refer to:
 Kumaoni people, an ethnic group of Uttarakhand, northern India
 Kumaoni language, the Indo-Aryan language they speak
 anything coming from or related to the following:
 Kumaon division, an administrative division of the state of Uttarakhand in Northern India
 Kumaon Kingdom, a former kingdom on this territory

See also
 Kumaoni cuisine
 Kumaoni Holi, a historical and cultural celebration
 Kumaon (disambiguation)

Language and nationality disambiguation pages